Alişar or Alishar or Alisar may refer to:

People
 Alisar Ailabouni, Austrian fashion model

Places

Azerbaijan
 Alışar, Azerbaijan, a village and municipality in the Sharur District of Nakhchivan Autonomous Republic

Iran
 Alisar, Iran, a village in Pain Taleqan Rural District, in the Central District of Taleqan County, Alborz Province

Turkey
 Alişar, Besni, a village in the district of Besni, Adıyaman Province
 Alişar Hüyük, an ancient city and archaeological site in Yozgat Province
 Alişar, Merzifon, a village in the district of Merzifon, Amasya Province
 Alişar, Sorgun, a village in the district of Sorgun, Yozgat Province